Loretta Ortiz Ahlf (born 24 February 1955) is a Mexican politician and lawyer who serves as a minister of the Supreme Court of Justice of the Nation.

Bio 
Loretta Ortiz has a degree on Law from Escuela Libre de Derecho, a master's degree in Human Rights from Universidad Iberoamericana and a doctorate in Human Rights and European Community Law from the National University of Distance Education.

She teaches subjects related to law, human rights and international law at Escuela Libre de Derecho and Universidad Iberoamericana, where she was also coordinator of the Public International Law subsystem from 1987 to 1989 and director of the law department from 1998 to 2007. She has been a member of the Mexican Bar Association since 1985. She has been the only Mexican honoured by The Hague Academy of International Law in being invited as professor of Public International Law at it. 

As Congresswoman, Ortiz was affiliated with the National Regeneration Movement (formerly to the Labor Party. As of 2013 she served as Deputy of the LXII Legislature of the Mexican Congress representing the Federal District.

On 2021 she was nominated by President Andrés Manuel López Obrador as candidate to Supreme Court of Justice of the Nation intended to take the seat of Minister José Fernando Franco González-Salas. She was included in the list among with Bernardo Bátiz and Verónica de Gyvés. On November 23 finally she was appointed by Senate of Mexico as Minister being effective on December 12, 2021. Ortiz will be the fourth female on Mexican court and the fourt nominated by López Obrador.

References

1955 births
Living people
People from Mexico City
Women members of the Chamber of Deputies (Mexico)
20th-century Mexican lawyers
Members of the Chamber of Deputies (Mexico) for Mexico City
Labor Party (Mexico) politicians
Morena (political party) politicians
Mexican women lawyers
21st-century Mexican politicians
21st-century Mexican women politicians
Deputies of the LXII Legislature of Mexico